The 2017 Dynamic Portugal Open, was the second Euro Tour 9-Ball pool event in 2017. The event was won by Netherlands' Nick van den Berg who defeated Spain's David Alcaide 9–5 in the final. In winning the event, van den Berg won his tenth Euro Tour event.

The event was the last tournament in the European qualification for the 2017 World Games. David Alcaide and Joshua Filler qualified as first and second place of the one-year ranking of the Euro Tour, and competed at the 9-Ball men's event. The Games were won by Carlo Biado, with Filler losing in the last 16, and Alcaide in the quarter-finals.

Tournament format
The event saw a total of 194 players compete, in a double-elimination knockout tournament, until the last 32 stage; where the tournament was contested as single elimination.

Prize fund

Tournament results

References

External links

Euro Tour
Sporting events in Portugal
2017 Euro Tour events